Ravno is a village and municipality located in Herzegovina-Neretva Canton of the Federation of Bosnia and Herzegovina, an entity of Bosnia and Herzegovina. Ravno was a separate municipality until 1963, when it became a part of the Trebinje municipality. In 1994, the border changed and Ravno became a separate municipality again. This time however, part of the frontier lands of Trebinje municipality were added as part of Ravno. These added borderlands went under the title Travunian Marches (Trebinjska Krajina) and were mostly inhabited by Serbs. The settlement of Ivanica has an unobstructed view of the Adriatic Sea.

Demographics

Population

Ethnic composition

Settlements 

Baljivac, Belenići, Bobovišta, Cicrina, Čavaš, Čopice, Čvaljina, Dvrsnica, Glavska, Golubinac, Gorogaše, Grebci, Ivanica, Kalađurđevići, Kijev Do, Kutina, Nenovići, Nevada, Orahov Do, Podosoje, Požarno, Prosjek, Ravno, Rupni Do, Slavogostići, Slivnica Bobani, Slivnica Površ, Sparožići, Šćenica Bobani, Trebimlja, Trnčina, Uskoplje, Velja Međa, Vlaka, Vukovići, Začula, Zagradinje, Zaplanik and Zavala, and parts of settlements: Baonine, Orašje Popovo and Rapti Bobani.

Ravno during the war in Bosnia and Herzegovina 

Ravno was first attacked in early October 1991 by JNA forces, which levelled the village on the way to attack Dubrovnik in the Croatian War of Independence.

Ravno again suffered heavy damage during the War in Bosnia and Herzegovina, when the majority of villages were destroyed. The area around Ravno was used as a corridor from where Dubrovnik county in Croatia was continuously attacked.

Notable people 

Dominik Andrijašević (fl. 1596–1637), Ragusan Franciscan bishop
Nikola Bošković (1642–1721), Ragusan trader and father of Roger Joseph Boscovich

References

External links 
 http://www.rb-donjahercegovina.ba

 
Municipalities of the Herzegovina-Neretva Canton
Villages in the Federation of Bosnia and Herzegovina
Villages in Bosnia and Herzegovina
Popovo Polje